William Cowherd (1763 – 24 March 1816) was a Christian minister serving a congregation in the City of Salford, England, immediately west of Manchester, and one of the philosophical forerunners of the Vegetarian Society founded in 1847. He was the founder of the Bible Christian Church; Cowherd advocated and encouraged members of his then small group of followers, known as "Cowherdites", to abstain from the eating of meat as a form of temperance.

Early life
After teaching philology at Beverley Cowherd came to Manchester and became curate to the Rev. John Clowes at St John's Church. Having studied the writings of Emanuel Swedenborg, he like Clowes, adopted Swedenborgian doctrine and preached at the Swedenborgian church in Peter Street. He is said to have been the only man to read the Latin writings of Swedenborg in their entirety.

Bible Christian Church
In 1800 Cowherd established a new congregation in Salford, building the chapel at his own expense. His chapel, Christ Church, was located in King Street, Salford, just across the River Irwell from Manchester. Believing that ministers should maintain themselves he conducted a school and practised as a physician from time to time. In 1809 he promulgated the doctrine that people should "eat no more meat till the world endeth" and abstain from alcoholic drinks.

The denomination he founded was known as the Bible Christian Church (not to be confused with Methodist sect of the same name based in the South-west of England). His early ideas and insight into the abstinence from eating meat, provided the basis for early ideas about vegetarianism. The message was preached in the U.S. when 41 members of the Bible Christian Church crossed the Atlantic in 1817.

Cowherd is credited with being the main figure advocating the theory of vegetarianism. It is noted that he asked his congregation in a sermon preached on 18 January 1809, to refrain from eating meat which culminated in the founding of the Vegetarian Society in 1847.

Death 

Cowherd died on 24 March 1816 and was buried in the Christ Church yard with the inscription at his request after Alexander Pope's verse about "He who would save a sinking land":All feared, none loved, and few understood

Library
Facts Authentic in Science and Religion towards a new Translation of the Bible which he had compiled was printed after his death. He left his personal library to the chapel and it was transferred to the new Bible Christian Chapel in Cross Lane. According to William Axon "It was at one time a circulating library, accessible to the public upon easy terms, but the books are not such as can be read by those who run." It was a scholar's library, strong in theology (including the London polyglott edition of the Bible, 1657), with some mystical works and books on health from the 17th century and later.

Publications 

 Select Hymns for the Use of Bible Christians
 Facts Authentic in Science and Religion: Designed to Illustrate a New Translation of the Bible (Part 1, 1818; Part 2, 1820)

See also
Christian vegetarianism

Notes

External links
 Vegetarian roots: The extraordinary tale of William Cowherd by Karen Millington, BBC (17 December 2012)

1763 births
1816 deaths
British vegetarianism activists
Burials in Greater Manchester
English Swedenborgians